The 2017 Africa U-20 Cup of Nations, officially known as the Total U-20 Africa Cup Of Nations, Zambia 2017, was the 14th edition of the Africa U-20 Cup of Nations (21st edition if tournaments without hosts are included), the biennial international youth football tournament organized by the Confederation of African Football (CAF) for players aged 20 and below. The tournament was set to take place in Zambia between 26 February – 12 March 2017.

The top four teams qualified for the 2017 FIFA U-20 World Cup in South Korea.

Qualification

The qualifiers were played between 1 April and 24 July 2016. At the end of the qualification phase, seven teams joined the hosts Zambia.

Player eligibility
Players born 1 January 1997 or later are eligible to participate in the competition.

Qualified teams
The following eight teams qualified for the final tournament. Defending champions Nigeria failed to qualify. Congo and Ghana also failed to qualify, thus the winners of five of the last six tournaments failed to qualify for this tournament.

Note: All appearance statistics count only those since the introduction of final tournament in 1991.

Venues

Match officials
A total of 12 referees and 14 assistant referees were selected for the tournament.

Referees

 Hélder Martins de Carvalho (Angola)
 Juste Ephrem Zio (Burkina Faso)
 Thierry Nkurunziza (Burundi)
 Antoine Effa (Cameroon)
 Victor Gomes  (South Africa)
 Ibrahim Nour El Din (Egypt)
 Sékou Ahmed Touré (Guinea)
 Sadok Selmi (Tunisia)
 Jackson Pavaza (Namibia)
 Louis Hakizimana (Rwanda)
 Joshua Bondo  (Botswana)
 Chewe Wisdom (Zambia)

Assistant referees

 Mokrani Gourari (Algeria)
 Issa Yahya (Chad)
 Steven Danilek M. Moyo (Congo)
 Sosseh Sulayman (Gambia)
 Sidiki Sidibe (Guinea)
 Cheruiyot Gilbert (Kenya)
 Mark Ssonko (Uganda)
 Warr Adbelrahman (Mauritania)
 Nabina Blaise Sebutu (DR Congo)
 Toure Sengne Cheikh (Senegal)
 Eldrick Adelaide (Seychelles)
 Khumalo Steven (South Africa)
 Diakite Moriba (Mali)
 Kasengele Romeo (Zambia)

Draw
The draw for the tournament took place on 24 October 2016, 11:00 local time (UTC+2) at the CAF Headquarters in Cairo.

The teams were seeded based on the results of the last edition (final tournament and qualifiers).

Squads

Each squad can contain a maximum of 21 players.

Group stage
The group winners and runners-up advance to the semi-finals and qualify for the 2017 FIFA U-20 World Cup.

Tiebreakers
The teams are ranked according to points (3 points for a win, 1 point for a draw, 0 points for a loss). If tied on points, tiebreakers are applied in the following order:
Number of points obtained in games between the teams concerned;
Goal difference in games between the teams concerned;
Goals scored in games between the teams concerned;
If, after applying criteria 1 to 3 to several teams, two teams still have an equal ranking, criteria 1 to 3 are reapplied exclusively to the matches between the two teams in question to determine their final rankings. If this procedure does not lead to a decision, criteria 5 to 7 apply;
Goal difference in all games;
Goals scored in all games;
Drawing of lots.

All times are local, CAT (UTC+2).

Group A

Group B

Knockout stage
In the knockout stage, if a match is level at the end of normal playing time, extra time will be played (two periods of 15 minutes each) and followed, if necessary, by kicks from the penalty mark to determine the winner, except for the third place match where no extra time will be played.

Bracket

Semi-finals

Third place match

Final

Awards

Winners

Individual awards
The following awards were given at the conclusion of the tournament.
Total Man of the Competition
 Patson Daka

Top scorer
 Luther Singh (4 goals, 2 assists)

Fair Play Award

CAF Best XI
Goalkeeper: Mangani Banda (Zambia)
Defenders: Ousseynou Diagne (Senegal), Mamadou Mbaye (Senegal), Solomon Sakala (Zambia)
Midfielders: Krepin Diatta (Senegal), Ibrahima Niane (Senegal), Sylla Morlaye (Guinea), Edward Chilufya (Zambia), Fashion Sakala (Zambia)
Forwards: Luther Singh (South Africa), Patson Daka (Zambia)
Substitutes: Lamine Sarr (Senegal), Prosper Chiluya (Zambia), Enock Mwepu (Zambia), Grant Margeman (South Africa), Liam Jordan (South Africa), Yamodou Toure (Guinea), Mohamed Aly Camara (Guinea)

Goalscorers
4 goals

 Luther Singh 
 Edward Chilufya
 Patson Daka

3 goals

 Fashion Sakala

2 goals

 Eric Ayuk
 Morlaye Sylla
 Ousseynou Diagne
 Krépin Diatta
 Ibrahima Niane
 Liam Jordan 

1 goal

 Samuel Gouet
 Kalvin Ketu
 Olivier Mbaizo
 Mostafa Abdalla
 Karim Nedved
 Mohamed Aly Camara
 Naby Bangoura
 Yamodou Touré
 Abdoul Karim Danté
 Moussa Diakité
 Sékou Koïta
 Aliou Badji
 Ibrahima Ndiaye
 Phakamani Mahlambi
 Tercious Malepe
 Grant Margeman
 Sibongakonke Mbatha
 Walaa Mohamed
 Hassan Mutwakil
 Khaled Osman
 Emmanuel Banda
 Enock Mwepu

Own goal
 Katlego Mohamme (against Guinea)

Qualified teams for FIFA U-20 World Cup
The following four teams from CAF qualified for the 2017 FIFA U-20 World Cup.

1 Bold indicates champion for that year. Italic indicates host for that year.

References

External links
Total U-20 Africa Cup Of Nations, Zambia 2017, CAFonline.com

 
U-20 Cup of Nations
Africa U-20 Cup of Nations
2017
International association football competitions hosted by Zambia